The flag of the Republic of Karelia is a tricolour featuring three equal horizontal stripes of red, sky blue and green. The height to length ratio is 2:3.

History
In November 1991, the Karelian Autonomous Soviet Socialist Republic was transformed into the Republic of Karelia. On November 27, the Presidium of the Supreme Council of Karelia adopted a resolution on changing state symbols and on holding a competition for a new coat of arms, flag and anthem of Karelia. On December 15, 1991, a resolution was adopted by the Presidium of the Supreme Council on the conditions of the competition and on the composition of the competitive commission. It was supposed to hold a competition for the flag and coat of arms of the republic from February 1 to April 30, 1992.

By May 1992, 60 projects of the flag and 20 of the coat of arms were submitted to the competition commission. During this period, heated debates broke out in the republic over whether to keep the flag of the Karelian Autonomous Soviet Socialist Republic or whether to return to the flag of the Uhtua Republic. As a result, after a few votes, the compromise version developed by the judge of the Constitutional Court of the Republic of Karelia Alexander Ivanovich Kinner, relying on the idea of the 1953 flag of the Karelian-Finnish SSR, won the Supreme Council of the Republic.

Article 118 of the Constitution of the Karelian-Finnish SSR then stated: “The national flag of the Karelian-Finnish SSR is a cloth consisting of three horizontally arranged colored stripes: top, red, medium blue, making up one sixth of the flag’s width, and bottom, green, one fifth of the width of the flag”.

Historical flags

Flags of Republic of Uhtua

Proposed flags

See also
 Flag of the Karelo-Finnish SSR

References
 The Constitution of the Republic of Karelia, paragraph 12.
 The official site of the Republic

Flag
Flags of the federal subjects of Russia
Karelia
Flags introduced in 1993